Law of Three may refer to:
For Gurdjieff's Law of Three see Fourth Way#Basis of teachings
For the Wiccan concept see Rule of Three (Wiccan)

See also 
Rule of Three (disambiguation)